The Eastern and Western Pagodas (东寺塔与西寺塔; Dongsi Ta / Xisi Ta) are two pagodas, about  apart, in the Xishan District of Kunming, Yunnan, China. Also known as the Pagoda of the East Temple  and the Pagoda of the West Temple  they were constructed in the late eighth or early ninth century AD, under the rule of the Kingdom of Nanzhao.

References 

Buildings and structures in Kunming
Tourist attractions in Kunming